Walter Sylvester Gamertsfelder (1885 – 1967) was a professor of philosophy, dean and thirteenth president of Ohio University, serving during the final years of World War II from 1943 to 1945.

Called to serve on an interim basis, Gamertsfelder came to the presidency of Ohio University from a dual deanship of the College of Arts and Sciences and the Graduate College. He had been a member of the faculty of philosophy and religion since 1921.

World War II created serious problems for the University while he served. These included accommodation of faculty leaves for service in the nation's war effort and the initiation of programs for faculty retraining and reassignment as enrollment dwindled to just over two hundred men, and needs for teaching Army Specialized Training Corpsmen and Reservists who were assigned to the campus developed. At the same time, his son served in the Philippines.  A memorial service in December 1945 honored 221 Ohio U. alumni who died in the war.

Upon completion of his term, Gamertsfelder returned to his deanships. Upon reaching the mandatory retirement age for administrators in 1951, he was granted the title Trustee Professor, the first person to be so honored. Gamertsfelder Hall, located on East Green, was built on the Ohio University campus in 1956 is named in his honor.

References

External links

1885 births
1967 deaths
Ohio University faculty
Presidents of Ohio University
20th-century American academics